The year 1723 in science and technology involved some significant events.

Geophysics
 George Graham discovers diurnal variation in Earth's magnetic field.
 Antoine de Jussieu publishes De l'Origine et des usages de la Pierre de Foudre on the origins of fossils, prehistoric stone tools and meteorites.

Optics
 Giacomo F. Maraldi makes the first observation of the Arago spot, unrecognized at this time.

Births
 January 5 – Nicole-Reine Lepaute, French astronomer (died 1788)
 January 31 – Petronella Johanna de Timmerman, Dutch scientist (died 1786)
 February 17 – Tobias Mayer, German cartographer, astronomer and physicist (died 1762)
 April 30 – Mathurin Jacques Brisson, French zoologist (died 1806)
 November 12 – Saverio Manetti, Italian natural historian (died 1785)

Deaths
 August 26 – Anton van Leeuwenhoek, Dutch pioneer of the microscope (born 1632)

References

 
18th century in science
1720s in science